Julio Fernández Larraz (born 12 March 1944) is a Cuban artist. He has lived in the United States since 1961. He first worked as a political caricaturist and cartoonist, signing his work Julio Fernandez. In the 1970s he began also to paint, and changed his signature to Julio Larraz.

Life 
Julio Fernandez Larraz was born in Cuba on 12 March 1944. His family were owners of the Cuban newspaper La Discusión. In 1961, the year of the failed American invasion of Cuba, the family fled the island for Miami, Florida, later moving to Washington, D.C., and then to New York City. Larraz first worked as a political caricaturist and cartoonist, signing his work "Julio Fernandez". His caricatures of political figures such as Indira Gandhi, Golda Meir and Richard Nixon were published in Esquire magazine, in The New York Times, in Rolling Stone and in The Washington Post. A caricature of Nixon as Louis XIV, captioned "L'état, c'est moi", was used on the cover of Time magazine.

Work 
Julio Larraz's first solo exhibitions was in 1971 at the Pyramid Gallery in Washington D.C. An exhibition of his work was held at the Boca Raton Museum of Art in Boca Raton, Florida, in 1998.

Collective exhibitions

In 1976 Larraz's work was chosen for Exhibition of Works by Candidates for Art Awards at the American Academy of Art and Letters/National Institute of Arts and Letters, New York. In 1985 Foire Internationale d’Art Contemporain (FIAC) was seen at the Grand Palais, Paris; and in 1992 Exposición arte cubano: Pasado y presente obra importante was exhibited at Gary Nader Fine Art, Coral Gables, Florida.

Awards
In 1975 Larraz won the Cintas Foundation Fellowship from the Institute of International Education, New York. In 1977 he was awarded the Acquisition Prize. Childe Hassam Fund Purchase Exhibition from the American Academy of Arts and Letters and Institute of Arts & Letters, New York.

References

Further reading 

Jose Veigas-Zamora, Cristina Vives Gutierrez, Adolfo V. Nodal, Valia Garzon, Dannys Montes de Oca. Memoria: Cuban Art of the 20th Century. California/International Arts Foundation, 2001. 
Jose Viegas. Memoria: Artes Visuales Cubanas Del Siglo Xx. California International Arts,  2004.   
Edward Lucie-Smith. Julio Larraz. Skiro, Milan, 2003.

External links 
 Julio Larraz Official Website

1944 births
Living people
Cuban contemporary artists
Exiles of the Cuban Revolution in the United States